The Nagaland Democratic Party was a political party in the Indian state of Nagaland. NDP was founded in 1999. The convenor of the party was Roland Lotha.

In the 2003 state assembly elections, the NDP contested as a part of the NPF-led Democratic Alliance of Nagaland.

On 22 March 2004, the NDP merged into the Nagaland Peoples Front.

References 

Defunct political parties in Nagaland
Political parties established in 1999
Political parties disestablished in 2004
1999 establishments in Nagaland